Borrelia duttoni, formerly known as Spirochaeta duttoni, is a species of Borrelia.

It can be associated with relapsing fever.  It is named after Joseph Everett Dutton, who died of the disease in 1905 while he and John Lancelot Todd were investigating "tick fever".

References

duttoni